YB, formerly known as Yoon Do-hyun Band, is a South Korean rock band. Formed in 1996, the band consists of Yoon Do-hyun (lead vocals, keyboard, guitar), Heo Jun (guitar, keyboard), Kim Jin-won (drums), Park Tae-hee (bass guitar) and Scott Hellowell (guitar). YB rose to major popularity and success during the 2002 World Cup, and once again in 2011 through appearing in the Korean TV show I Am a Singer. They have performed across the world and regularly headline major rock festivals in South Korea.

The band has released nine full-length studio albums and numerous other releases and live albums. Their music style is primarily influenced by classic rock with elements of modern rock, also combined with a contemporary Korean cultural identity. YB is widely known for their explosive and dynamic live performances, and a resonant directness in vocal style and songwriting. YB has won the "Best Music" award from Korea's three main broadcast stations KBS, MBC and SBS, and in 2011 won the "Mnet Specialized Award" at the Mnet Asian Music Awards.

History

Formation
Yoon Do-hyun debuted as a solo artist with the album In Front of the Post Office in Autumn (가을 우체국 앞에서) in 1994, and following that formed the eponymously named Yoon Do-hyun Band in 1996, with himself on vocals, drummer Kim Jin-won, guitarist Yoo Byung-yeol, and bass guitarist Park Tae-hee. Later that year, Yoon played the lead role in Jungle Story, Kim Hong-joon's film that recounts the rise and fall of a fictitious, underground band. His bandmates also appeared in the film.

The initial lack of success led to Yoon Do-hyun Band almost disbanding in 2000, and guitarist Yoo Byung-yeol left the band and was replaced by Heo Jun.

Other successes (2003–2011)
YB won the WPMA (World Peace Music Award) in 2003 for their activities in 2002 promoting human rights, and through a concert in North Korea called "Oh Unification Korea". This is the first time a rock band has performed officially in North Korea.

Following YB's rise to being the foremost rock band in Korea, Yoon Do-hyun began to host TV shows such as Yoon Do-hyun's Love Letter (2002-2008) and grow as a celebrity in Korean media. In 2007, YB performed at the SXSW music festival held in Austin Texas, being the first Korean band to do so. YB continued to release various albums and tour extensively within Korea. In 2005 they were the first Korean band to tour Europe, returning to a crowded Trafalgar Square in London in 2008.

In 2009 they embarked on the Warped Tour in the USA. Following a friendship developed from 2005, YB began to include Scott Hellowell from England as a special guest guitarist for concerts in the summer and eventually winter, (2008-2010). This relationship progressed into the band inviting him to become a full-time official band member in 2011. His official induction to the band was later televised in Yoon Do-hyun's MUST music TV show.

Continued popularity (2011–present)
In 2011, YB joined a cast of seven artists who provided the original line up for MBC's I Am a Singer, a TV show which proved to be a cultural phenomenon in Korea and across Asia that year winning many awards. This led to YB's second wave of huge success, at the same time the show also instated Yoon Do-hyun as its host. As a result of a second rise to major popularity, YB performed in several overseas concerts including China, Japan and America.

YB are regular headliners at many of the biggest Korean rock festivals such as Pentaport and Busan International Rock Festival. YB performed in Pyongyang on April 1, 2018. They contributed a cover of the Metallica song "Sad But True" to the charity tribute album The Metallica Blacklist, released in September 2021.

Discography
Studio albums
 In Front of the Post Office of Autumn (가을 우체국 앞에서) (released as Yoon Do-hyun solo album) (1994)
 Don't Cover it Up (가리지좀 마) (1997)
 Alienation (蘇外(소외)) (1998)
 Korean Rock Remade (4집 - 한국 Rock 다시 부르기) (1999)
 An Urbanite (2001)
 [YB] Stream (2003)
 Why Be (2006)
 Coexistence (共存 (공존)) (2009)
 Reel Impulse (2013)
Live albums
 Yoon Do-hyun Band (2000)
 Live is Life (2002)
 After 10 Years (2007)
 I Bow (2010)
Singles
 "Nation Anthem (애국가)"
 "2006 World-Cup Cheer Song"
 "Han Ban Do O.S.T - 1178"
 "Tell Me"
"Taxi Driver O.S.T - SILENCE"

Awards

Mnet Asian Music Awards

References

External links 
 http://ybrocks.com
 http://deecompany.net/yb/

South Korean pop rock music groups
South Korean hard rock musical groups
Musical groups established in 1994
MAMA Award winners